Caryne Selbonne was a French international footballer who played for Paris Saint-Germain as a defender.

References

1967 births
People from Pointe-à-Pitre
Paris Saint-Germain Féminine players
French women's footballers
Division 1 Féminine players
Women's association football defenders
France women's international footballers
Living people